is a Japanese footballer currently playing as a forward for Vanraure Hachinohe.

Career statistics

Club
Updated to January 1st, 2022.

Notes

References

External links

1992 births
Living people
People from Uwajima, Ehime
Association football people from Ehime Prefecture
Kochi University alumni
Japanese footballers
Association football forwards
Japan Football League players
J3 League players
Sony Sendai FC players
FC Imabari players
Vanraure Hachinohe players